John Butler (1891 – 16 February 1968) was an Irish politician, farmer and trade union official. He was first elected to Dáil Éireann at the 1922 general election for the Waterford–Tipperary East constituency as a Labour Party Teachta Dála (TD). He was re-elected for the Waterford constituency at the 1923 general election. He lost his seat at the June 1927 general election. He stood for the Dáil again at several subsequent general elections but was not elected.

He was elected to the 2nd Seanad on the Labour Panel in 1938. He served in the Seanad until losing his seat at the 1957 Seanad election. He was re-elected on the Labour Panel at the 1961 Seanad election, and he did not contest the 1965 election.

His son Pierce Butler also served as a Senator from 1969 to 1983.

See also
Families in the Oireachtas

References

1891 births
1968 deaths
Members of the 3rd Dáil
Members of the 4th Dáil
Members of the 2nd Seanad
Members of the 3rd Seanad
Members of the 4th Seanad
Members of the 5th Seanad
Members of the 6th Seanad
Members of the 7th Seanad
Members of the 8th Seanad
Members of the 10th Seanad
Politicians from County Waterford
Irish farmers
Irish trade unionists
Labour Party (Ireland) TDs
Labour Party (Ireland) senators